The Chicago Comic & Entertainment Expo (C2E2) is a Chicago fan convention dedicated to comics, pop culture, graphic novels, anime, manga, video games, toys, movies, and television. The inaugural event was held April 16–18, 2010 at the McCormick Place in Chicago.

History
C2E2 was held for the first time April 16–18, 2010, with an estimated attendance between 20,000 and 30,000 attendees. The convention included dozens of professional and amateur comic book artists, and prominently featured booths from the biggest comic book publishers. The convention also featured a special auction with the actual props from the original Iron Man movie.

The second C2E2 was held March 18–20, 2011 and included Thor actor Chris Hemsworth. Other guests included Buffy the Vampire Slayer and Dollhouse actress Eliza Dushku, The Walking Dead actors Laurie Holden and Jon Bernthal, and Supernatural actor Mark Sheppard.

The third C2E2 was held April 13–15, 2012, and 41,000 attendees were reported. It included Doctor Who and Torchwood actor John Barrowman, Lord of the Rings actor Sean Astin, and The Walking Dead actors Steven Yeun and Lauren Cohan.

The fourth C2E2 was held April 26–28, 2013, and 53,000 attendees were reported. Some of the spotlight guests included the 1960s Batman TV series actors Adam West, Burt Ward, and Julie Newmar, Game of Thrones actress Natalie Dormer, Hellboy actor Ron Perlman, The Walking Dead actors Laurie Holden and Chandler Riggs, Doctor Who actor Peter Davison, The Guild actress Felicia Day, and comedian Kevin Smith.

C2E2 2014 was held April 25–27, 2014. It included comic legend Stan Lee, Torchwood actress Eve Myles, Game of Thrones actors Alfie Allen, Natalia Tena, and Kristian Nairn, Teen Wolf actors Tyler Posey and Crystal Reed, and The Southern Vampire Mysteries series author Charlaine Harris.

C2E2 2015 was held April 24–26, 2015. Comic legend Stan Lee appeared once again this year. Other notable guests included Agent Carter actress Hayley Atwell, Agents of S.H.I.E.L.D. actress Ming-Na Wen, Doctor Who actor Sylvester McCoy, Game of Thrones actors Jason Momoa and Finn Jones, Firefly actress Jewel Staite, Mystery Science Theater 3000 creator Joel Hodgson, Lord of the Rings actor Sean Astin, and the most of the cast of Orphan Black.

C2E2 2016 was held March 18–20, 2016. Some of the spotlight entertainment guests included Agents of S.H.I.E.L.D. actors Chloe Bennet and J. August Richards, Supergirl actresses Melissa Benoist and Chyler Leigh, and Sons of Anarchy actors Ryan Hurst and Tommy Flanagan.

The 2020 C2E2 was held Feb. 28 to March 1, just before the COVID-19 pandemic. The 2021 edition was originally planned to be held March 26-28, however, it was postponed to December 10-12 due to the pandemic.

Dates

Events 
C2E2 has panels by the comics and anime industry, entertainment guests, and attendees, along with special screenings of shows and live recordings of podcasts. Since 2013, C2E2 and We Are Cosplay organize a march in the Chicago St. Patrick's Day Parade with cosplayers.

C2E2 Crown Championships of Cosplay 

C2E2 Crown Championships of Cosplay, claimed to be "the largest and most prestigious cosplay competition in the world," began in 2014. It is a craftsmanship award show with a pre-judging session and a stage display, which is live-streamed over the internet. All entries are judged in one of four categories:

 Comic Books
 Anime & Fantasy
 Video Games
 Movies & Television

The winners of these categories are the finalists for the local contest. The top three winners from the finalists receive cash prizes ($1,000, $500 and $250). Since 2016, the first place champion of the Chicago contest is also entered into the global Crown Championships of Cosplay, held at the same time, to compete with the champions from ReedPop's other cosplay contests from around the world. There are three champions from the United States (from New York and Seattle in addition to Chicago), plus champions from Australia, China, Austria, Singapore, Indonesia, India, and France. The global champions also win cash prizes of $5,000, $2,000 and $1,000.

Winners

Judges 
Past judges include Yaya Han (Cosplayer), Ivy DoomKitty (Cosplayer), Ann Foley (Costume designer for Agents of S.H.I.E.L.D.), Leri Greer (Senior concept designer for Weta Workshop, worked on Mad Max: Fury Road), Stephanie Maslansky  (Costume designer for Daredevil and Jessica Jones), Ashley Eckstein (Her Universe), Austin Scarlett (Fashion designer from Project Runway), Neville Page (film and television creature and concept designer), and Nan Cibula-Jenkins (Head of costume design at The Theatre School at DePaul University).

References

External links

 Official Website

2010 establishments in Illinois
Comics conventions in the United States
Events in Chicago
Festivals in Chicago
Multigenre conventions
Recurring events established in 2010
Conventions in Illinois